Aşağıdolay (Kurdish: Fetla Jêrî) is suburban area in Bismil district of Diyarbakır Province, Turkey. As of 2000, the area has a population of 87. Located approximately 10 km away from Bismil district of Diyarbakir, the settlement has a primary school.

The economy of Aşağıdolay mainly depends on agriculture.

Demography

References 

Villages in Bismil District